Ricardo Kieboom (born 20 September 1991) is a retired Dutch professional footballer who played as a goalkeeper.

At the end of November 2021, Kieboom announced his retirement from football after several years with ankle problems.

References

1991 births
Living people
Dutch footballers
ADO Den Haag players
Sparta Rotterdam players
VV Katwijk players
Kozakken Boys players
Eerste Divisie players
Tweede Divisie players
Association football goalkeepers
Footballers from Ridderkerk